Star Académie is a Canadian reality television series that started in 2003, aimed primarily at the Quebec television audience, featuring an array of young women and men under the age of 30 competing for the title of the next solo singing sensation. It is the French-Canadian adaptation of the French television show Star Academy produced by Dutch company Endemol, based on the Spanish format called Operación Triunfo. There have been seasons in 2003, 2004, 2005, 2009, and 2012. In June 2019, TVA stated that a reboot for Star Académie is possible. Two months later, the network announced that the reboot is set for early 2021. On September 22, 2020, it was announced that singer Patrice Michaud would take over Julie Snyder as host for the 2021 season. In June 2021, Michaud stated that he would not return as host for the following season. In August 2021, it was announced that singer-songwriter Marc Dupré would replace Michaud as host in 2022.

Description
It is aired for two months (February to April) on the TVA network. Hosted by Julie Snyder, the show is a competition to find the best young francophone singer, not only in Quebec, but also in French-speaking regions of Canada, having auditions in Ontario (Eastern Ontario) and New Brunswick (l'Acadie). Then fourteen people (seven of each gender) are chosen to compete in front of the cameras.

It is separated in two simultaneous formats: each day during the week, a show presents moments of the life and training in the common house of the Académiciens and each weekend sees one Gala show where the contenders sing. At each of these Galas, some participants are put on the line and one is chosen to stay by the public and by the judging panel.

It proved to be immensely popular, drawing not only viewership, but genuine affection from the public for the young idealistic contenders. Pride also arises for the regions where the participants are from, like pride was felt by many from the Acadian people when Wilfred Le Bouthillier, from Acadia, was chosen for the competition and later crowned winner of the first, 2003 edition.

It has also proved to be an effective springboard for the singing careers of some of its past participants, like 2003 finalists Wilfred Le Bouthillier, who recorded with the help of renowned Cajun singer Zachary Richard, and Marie-Élaine Thibert, who also released an album and sung for the soundtrack of Léa Pool's movie The Blue Butterfly.

The show was on a 4-year hiatus due to the second pregnancy of the hostess and her busy schedule with Le Banquier, the French-Canadian version of Deal or No Deal.

Origins
It is inspired by the French show Star Academy and is similar to the Pop Idol and American Idol phenomena. The name was francized for its Quebec adaptation because of the local importance given to the respect of the French language. However, it does create a grammatically impossible phrase in French. The proper translation would be Académie des stars, although this could be considered less catchy. Francization is typically given even more importance in Quebec French than in France itself (see Office québécois de la langue française).

A relatively small, but notable difference in the show format from its French counterpart is the selection process. Each week, the French version asks the public and judging panel to vote for which one, out of the contenders in danger, should be excluded from the show. The results are announced live, on stage, to the excluded member and the viewers. While this formula was followed in the beginning for Star Académie, it soon was changed because of protests, for the system was seen as cruel treatment to the excluded participant. On one early show, singer Daniel Boucher quit the studio halfway through the show because of this impression. Consequently, the public and judges are now asked to vote for the participant to remain at the Académie. In all seasons, the results are announced live.

Criticism
Star Académie drew criticism for the capitalist and vertical integration strategies of producing megacompany Quebecor to publicize the show and make it profitable. For example, each vote from the public costs one dollar, the website is in large part reserved to paying members and the Quebecor company, massive owner of many Quebec media, heavily promoted the show via TVA (its own television network), all of its magazines and newspapers like 7 Jours and Journal de Montréal. Astral Media's RockDétente also did a lot of heavy promoting themselves during the 2005 edition, as the official stations of Star Académie. Also were criticized the instant celebrity machine and supposed lack of artistic integrity aspects of the whole enterprise.

Theme songs
2003: Et c'est pas fini by Stéphane Venne
2004: Un nouveau jour va se lever by Jacques Michel
2005: L'étoile d'Amérique by Claude Léveillée
2009: 1000 coeurs debout by Cali
2012: Toi + Moi by Grégoire
2021: Maintenant et partout by Hubert Lenoir and Jérôme 50
2022: Changer le monde by Laurence Nerbonne

Champions
2003: Wilfred Le Bouthillier from Tracadie–Sheila, New Brunswick
2004: Stéphanie Lapointe from Brossard, Quebec
2005: Marc-André Fortin from Hébertville, Quebec
2009: Maxime Landry from Saint-Gédéon-de-Beauce, Quebec
2012: Jean-Marc Couture from Val-d'Amour, New Brunswick
2021: William Cloutier from Victoriaville, Quebec
2022: Krystel Mongeau from Sherbrooke, Quebec

Académie's principal
2003: Josélito Michaud
2004: Denise Filiatrault
2005: Denis Bouchard (René Simard had retired before the show started)
2009: René Angélil
2012: René Angélil
2021: Lara Fabian
2022: Lara Fabian

Notable guests
Here's all the guest performers in Star Académie.

Bryan Adams
Charles Aznavour
Beau Dommage
Plastic Bertrand
Daniel Boucher
Isabelle Boulay
Jean Charest
Céline Dion
The Lost Fingers
Éric Lapointe
Stromae
Patricia Kaas
Lady Gaga
Lara Fabian
Samantha Fox
Roger Hodgson
Bernard Landry
Daniel Lavoie

Marjo
Jason Mraz
Paul Piché
Michel Rivard
Natasha St-Pier
Kreesha Turner
Gino Vannelli
Roch Voisine
Dennis DeYoung
Les Trois Accords
Hedley
These Kids Wear Crowns
Lionel Richie
Mika
Charlotte Cardin

Discography

Official albums
2003: Star Académie - (5× Platinum)
2004: Star Académie 2004
2004: Star Académie 2004: Meilleurs moments des finalistes aux galas
2005: Star Académie 2005
2009: Star Académie 2009
2012: Star Académie 2012 - (2× Platinum)
2012: Star Académie Noel - (Platinum)

Contestants' albums

First season (2003)
2003: Wilfred Le Bouthillier by Wilfred Le Bouthillier
2004: Marie-Élaine Thibert by Marie-Élaine Thibert
2004: Comment J'feel by Maritza Bossé-Pelchat
2004: Inoxydable by Marie-Mai Bouchard
2004: Ent'chums by Dave Bourgeois, François Babin, Stéphane Mercier
2004: Légendes Urbaines by Émily Bégin
2005: Quand je ferme les yeux by Annie Villeneuve
2005: Sortilège by Élyse Robinault
2006: Poussières by Wilfred Le Bouthillier
2007: Dangereuse Attraction by Marie-Mai Bouchard
2007: Comme ça by Marie-Élaine Thibert
2007: Voila by Stéphane Mercier
2007: Dave Bourgeois by Dave Bourgeois
2007: Emily by Émily Begin
2008: The Open Book by Élyse Robinault
2008: Suzie Villeneuve by Suzie Villeneuve
2009: Droit devant by Wilfred Le Bouthillier
2009: Version 3.0 by Marie-Mai Bouchard
2009: Annie Villeneuve by Annie Villeneuve
2011: Les nuits d'Émily by Émily Bégin
2012: C.O.B.R.A. by Marie-Mai Bouchard
2012: Telle qu'elle by Annie Villeneuve

Second season (2004)
2004: Corneliu Montano by Corneliu Montano
2005: Sur le fil by Stéphanie Lapointe
2005: Tête première by Meggie Lagacé
2005: Marc-André by Marc-André Niquet
2005: Faut que j'te dise by Martin Giroux
2006: On s'en reparlera by Dave Roussy
2006: Je l'ai jamais dit à personne by Étienne Drapeau
2007: C'est pas de ma faute by Jean-Francois Prud'homme
2007: Le coeur qui chante by Corneliu Montano
2008: En cavale by Martin Giroux
2008: Étienne Drapeau by Étienne Drapeau
2009: Maintenant...Femme by Marie-Ève Côté
March 10, 2009: Donne-moi quelque chose qui ne finit pas by Stéphanie Lapointe
March 23, 2010: La vie ça s'mérite by Martin Giroux
September 2010: Paroles et Musique by Étienne Drapeau
November 2011: Influences by Corneliu Montano

Third season (2005)
2007: Marc-André Fortin by Marc-André Fortin
2007: Dans mon espace by Bruno Labrie
2007: Je suis qui je suis by Linda Rocheleau
2007: Sur l'autre rive by Annie Blanchard
2008: L'enfant roi by Marc Angers
2008: Ad vitam by Audrey Gagnon
2009: Juste ici by Marc-André Fortin
2010: Marcher vers le nord by Annie Blanchard

Fourth season (2009)
2009: Vox Pop by Maxime Landry
May 18, 2010: Un pied à terre by William Deslauriers
May 25, 2010: Chacun son chemin by Pascal Chaumont
January 2011: Fruits défendus by Brigitte Boisjoli
November 2011: L'avenir entre nous by Maxime Landry
April 2012: Le goût du bonheur by Émilie Lévesque
2013 "J'suis la" by François Lachance.

Contestants

2003
François Babin from Rimouski, Bas-Saint-Laurent
Jean-François Bastien from Saint-Boniface, Mauricie
Émily Bégin from Saint-Jérôme, Laurentides
Dave Bourgeois from Baie-Comeau, Côte-Nord
Maritza Bossé-Pelchat from Montreal, Montreal Region (born in the Dominican Republic)
Marie-Mai Bouchard from Boucherville, Montérégie
Wilfred Le Bouthillier from Tracadie–Sheila, New Brunswick
Stéphane Mercier from Normétal, Abitibi-Témiscamingue
Pascal Nguyen-Deschênes from Charlesbourg, Capitale-Nationale
Élyse Robineault from Montréal-Nord, Montreal Region
Martin Rouette from Montreal, Montreal Region
Marie-Élaine Thibert from LaSalle, Montreal Region
Annie Villeneuve from Jonquière, Saguenay
Suzie Villeneuve from Jonquière, Saguenay

2004
Véronique Claveau from Rimouski, Bas-Saint-Laurent
Marie-Ève Côté from Brossard, Montérégie
Étienne Drapeau from Quebec City, Capitale-Nationale
Stéphanie Lapointe from Brossard, Montérégie
Meggie Lagacé from Saint-Hubert, Montérégie
Jannie Lemay from Rouyn-Noranda, Abitibi
Marie-France Lettre from Gatineau, Outaouais
Cornéliu Montano from Montreal, Montreal Region (born in Romania)
Marc-André Niquet from Pierreville, Centre-du-Québec
Dave Roussy from Port-Daniel, Gaspésie
Jason Battah from Joliette, Lanaudière
Sandy Duperval-Agnant from Montreal, Montreal Region
Jean-François Prud'homme from Saint-Donat, Lanaudière
Martin Giroux from Gatineau, Outaouais

2005
David Tremblay, from Jonquière, Quebec
Marc Angers, from Boucherville, Quebec
Steve Provost, from Saint-Faustin, Quebec
Audrey Gagnon, from Jonquière, Quebec
Annie Blanchard, from Maisonnette (Caraquet), New Brunswick
Jennifer Silencieux, from Montreal, Quebec
Francis Greffard, from Rapide-Danseur, Quebec
Jenny Hachey (leaves after the first gala, on September 18), from L'Annonciation, Quebec
Kaven Haché, from Sainte-Anne-des-Monts, Quebec
Linda Rocheleau, from Saint-Bruno-de-Guigues, Quebec
Stéphanie Bédard, from Drummondville, Quebec
Marc-André Fortin, from Hébertville, Québec
Valérie Boivin, from Montreal, Quebec
Bruno Labrie, from Châteauguay, Quebec

2009 
 Karine Labelle, Huberdeau, Laurentides
 Joanie Goyette, Saint-Tite, Mauricie
 Brigitte Boisjoli, Drummondville, Centre-du-Québec
 Carolanne D'Astous-Paquet, Sayabec, Bas-Saint-Laurent 
 Sophie Vaillancourt, Laval, Laval
 Vanessa Duchel, Prévost, Laurentides
 Émilie Lévesque, Saint-Malo, Estrie
 Rich Ly, Montreal, Montreal
 Pascal Chaumont, La Conception, Laurentides
 Jean-Philippe Audet, Quebec City, Capitale-Nationale
 Olivier Beaulieu, Drummondville, Centre-du-Québec
 Maxime Landry, Saint-Gédéon-de-Beauce, Chaudière-Appalaches 
 William Deslauriers, Plessisville, Centre-du-Québec
 Maxime Proulx, Plaisance, Outaouais

Through the weeks 

During the first Gala, Vanessa and William were chosen by the public. Also, Émilie and Maxime P. were chosen by the judges.
During weeks 7 and 8, the contestants were automatically in danger.
 The contestant was in danger and eliminated
 The contestant was in danger but saved by the judges during the gala
 The contestant was in danger but saved by the public during the gala
 The contestant wins the competition

2012 
Andréanne A. Malette, Granby
Bryan Audet, Saint-Élie-de-Caxton
Andrée-Anne Leclerc, Saint-Jean-Chrysostome
François Lachance, Alma
Carole-Anne Gagnon-Lafond, Rimouski
Jason Guérette, Sainte-Anne-de-Madawaska
Joannie Benoit, Tracadie-Sheila
Jean-Marc Couture, Val-d'Amour, New Brunswick
Mélissa Bédard, Quebec City
Mike Lee (Jean-Mickaël Lavernay), Montréal (born in Réunion)
Sarah-May Vézeau, Repentigny
Olivier Dion, Sherbrooke
Sophie Pelletier, Rivière-Ouelle
Simon Morin, Le Gardeur

Through the weeks 

During the first Gala, out of 20 candidates, 14 were selected to go to the Academie, 6 female candidates and 6 male candidates were saved by the Judges without performing. 1 female and 1 male candidates were saved by the public based on a vote on their performance. 
During Gala 8 and 9, the contestants were automatically in danger. (Gala 8 = Male, Gala 9 = Female)
 The contestant was in danger and eliminated
 The contestant was in danger but saved by the judges during the gala
 The contestant was in danger but saved by the public during the gala
 The contestant wins the competition

See also
List of Quebec television series imports and exports
List of Quebec television series
List of Quebec musicians
List of Quebec regions
Television of Quebec
Music of Quebec
Culture of Quebec
Vidéotron
The One: Making a Music Star (English adaptation broadcast on ABC and CBC)

References

External links
Official site 
Album entry on Amazon

Television shows filmed in Quebec
2003 Canadian television series debuts
2000s Canadian reality television series
2012 Canadian television series endings
2010s Canadian reality television series
TVA (Canadian TV network) original programming
Star Academy